= Project One (gallery) =

Project One was an art gallery and lounge located in San Francisco, California's design district, which showcased the work of new contemporary artists and hosted both new and established DJs in a 3,200 square feet (300 m^{2}) converted warehouse space, featuring a sound system and bar.

In 2009 Deborah Schoeneman of The New York Times praised the gallery for what she called its "devoted and eclectic clientele" and ambiance.
